The Crossroads is a shopping mall located in Portage, Michigan. The mall features 100 stores and a food court. The anchor stores are JCPenney and Macy's. There are 2 vacant anchor stores that were once Sears and Burlington (previously Mervyn's). The Crossroads Mall had been owned by Brookfield Properties (and predecessor General Growth Properties) from 1999 until its sale to Kohan Retail Investment Group in January 2022.

History

The Crossroads Mall opened in Portage, Michigan, in 1980. At the time, it was the only two-level mall in Michigan outside Metro Detroit. JCPenney and Hudson's were the first two anchor stores, with Sears opening in 1982. Westcor built the mall in association with the Dayton-Hudson Corporation, which owned the Hudson's chain at the time. The mall was built on South Westnedge Avenue south of Interstate 94. Tenants on opening day included Arby's, Casual Corner, Claire's, County Seat, B. Dalton, Hickory Farms, Kinney Shoes, and Consumer Value Stores. Mervyns was later added as a fourth anchor, opening in 1989.

General Growth Properties acquired the mall in 1999, and a food court was added in the early 2000s.

Hudson's was renamed Marshall Field's in 2001, and subsequently became Macy's in September 2006. Mervyns closed in early 2006 along with the rest of the chain's Michigan stores, and Burlington Coat Factory opened its first Kalamazoo store in the space vacated by Mervyn's. In August 2019 Sears announced they would be closing their Crossroads location with liquidation sales starting on August 15. The store's final day of business was November 10, 2019.  In 2021 Burlington Coat relocated to the former Value City Furniture at the Maple Hill Pavilion in Kalamazoo.

The mall was purchased for $25 million in January 2022 by the Kohan Retail Investment Group.

References

Further reading

External links
The Crossroads Official Website

Shopping malls in Michigan
Buildings and structures in Kalamazoo County, Michigan
Shopping malls established in 1980
Tourist attractions in Kalamazoo County, Michigan
1980 establishments in Michigan
Kohan Retail Investment Group